The London Borough of Haringey maintains  of parks and open spaces. By 2015, 20 of these were accredited with a Green Flag Award.  Until their disbandment in April 2009, the parks were patrolled by the Haringey Parks Constabulary.


List of Parks and Open Spaces

 Albert Road Recreation Ground
 Belmont Recreation Ground
 Bluebell Wood
 Bruce Castle Park
 Chapmans Green
 Chestnuts Park
 Coldfall Wood
 Downhills Park
 Down Lane Park
 Ducketts Common
 Fairland Park
 Finsbury Park
 Granville Road Spinney
 Hartington Park
 Lordship Recreation Ground
 Manchester Gardens
 Markfield Park
 Muswell Hill Playing Fields
 The Paddock
 Paignton Park
 Priory Park
 Railway Fields
 Russell Park
 Stanley Road Open Space
 Stationers Park
 Wood Green Common
 Woodside Park

Local Nature Reserves
Haringey Council maintains three local nature reserves.
 Parkland Walk (joint managed with Islington council).
 Queen's Wood
 Railway Fields

Parks not maintained by Haringey Council

 Highgate Wood which is maintained by the Corporation of London.
 Tottenham Marshes which is maintained by Lee Valley Regional Park Authority (which Haringey Council contributes to  financially).
 Alexandra Park which is maintained by Alexandra Palace.

See also
Parks and open spaces in London

References